Thoros, alternative transliteration T'oros, is the Armenian variant of the Greek name Theodoros (Theodore). It may refer to:

Historical figures
Chronologically:
Thoros of Edessa (died 1098)
Thoros of Marash, aka Thatoul (late 11th – early 12th century), Armenian leader who interacted with the early Crusader states
Thoros I of Armenia (ruling 1102–1129)
Thoros II of Armenia (ruling 1140–1169)
Thoros III of Armenia (ruling 1293–1298)
 Thoros the Younger (ruling 1303/05–1307), alternate term for Leo III, King of Armenia, son of Thoros III

Fiction
 Thoros of Myr, a character in George R. R. Martin's A Song of Ice and Fire

See also
 Toros (disambiguation)
 Theodore (disambiguation)
 Theodoros, a given name